Telese Terme, called simply Telese until 1991, is a city, comune (municipality) and former episcopal seat in the Province of Benevento, in the Campania region of southern Italy. It is located in the valley of the Calore, well known for its sulfuric hot springs.

Etymology 
Telesia is an old word for the gem Sapphire.

History 
Telese was an ancient Samnite (Italic) city, known as T(h)elesia. The city was captured by Hannibal in 217 BCE; later, the victor Roman general Scipio Africanus founded a Roman colony there.

In 460 was established a Diocese of Telese / Thelesina (Latin adjective).

Having fallen into decay after the Gothic War it was conquered by the Longobards, becoming part of the Lombard Duchy of Benevento as seat of a gastaldry (district).

The city was destroyed in the years 847 and 860, by the Saracens, and again in the 11th century, during the war between King Roger II of Sicily and the Norman counts of the southern Italian mainland.

A new Telesia was built; however, it was again pulverized in 1349, this time by an earthquake.

Its former cathedral cattedrale Santa Croce, dedicated to the Holy Cross, now in ruins, was decommissioned after the bishops transferred their see to nearby Cerreto Sannita, yet the see retained the alternative title Diocese of Telese as well, even after a further merger into the Diocese of Cerreto Sannita–Telese–Sant’Agata de’ Goti.

In 1883, after the Unification of Italy, thermal baths were built, hence the current full name Telese Terme since 1991. Telese became an independent commune in 1934.

Main sights 
The remains of baths and of an amphitheatre still exist; the city was supplied with water by an aqueduct. There are sulphur springs in the vicinity, which may have supplied the baths.

See also 
 List of Catholic dioceses in Italy

References